A pisonet also known as piso wifi is a ''mini-type'' internet cafe or computer shop mainly found in the areas of Metro Manila and the Philippines. A "pisonet" is a major hub for internet enthusiasts and children who only have a small amount of money to surf and play some games which more contributes "demand" to this business.

The rates usually start from 10 Peso and can vary  cafe to cafe.

Etymology 
Pisonet came from the words "piso" or one peso, and "internet", "pisong internet" meaning one peso internet (rent).

History 
Pisonet was invented around 2010. Internet access has not improved much with 60% of poor neighborhoods in Manila lacking basic internet access.

References

Internet cafés
Internet in the Philippines